(Latin for "creation out of nothing") is the doctrine that matter is not eternal but had to be created by some divine creative act. It is a theistic answer to the question of how the universe comes to exist. It is in contrast to Ex nihilo nihil fit or "nothing comes from nothing", which means that all things were formed from preexisting things; an idea by the Greek philosopher Parmenides (c. 540 – c. 480 BC) about the nature of all things, and later more formally stated by Titus Lucretius Carus (c. 99 – c. 55 BC).

Understanding of concept through contrast

Ex nihilo nihil fit: uncreated matter 

Ex nihilo nihil fit means that nothing comes from nothing. In ancient creation myths, the universe is formed from eternal formless matter, namely the dark and still primordial ocean of chaos. In Sumerian myth this cosmic ocean is personified as the goddess Nammu "who gave birth to heaven and earth" and had existed forever; in the Babylonian creation epic Enuma Elish pre-existent chaos is made up of fresh-water Apsu and salt-water Tiamat, and from Tiamat the god Marduk created Heaven and Earth; in Egyptian creation myths a pre-existent watery chaos personified as the god Nun and associated with darkness, gave birth to the primeval hill (or in some versions a primeval lotus flower, or in others a celestial cow); and in Greek traditions the ultimate origin of the universe, depending on the source, is sometimes Okeanos (a river that circles the Earth), Night, or  water. 

To these can be added the account of the Book of Genesis, which opens with God separating and restraining the waters, not creating the waters themselves out of nothing. The Hebrew sentence which opens Genesis, Bereshit bara Elohim et hashamayim ve'et ha'aretz, can be interpreted in at least three ways:
 As a statement that the cosmos had an absolute beginning (In the beginning, God created the heavens and earth).
 As a statement describing the condition of the world when God began creating (When in the beginning God created the heavens and the earth, the earth was untamed and shapeless).
 As background information (When in the beginning God created the heavens and the earth, the earth being untamed and shapeless, God said, Let there be light!).

It has been known since the Middle Ages that on strictly linguistic and exegetical grounds option 1 is not the preferred translation. Our society sees the origin of matter as a question of crucial importance, but for ancient cultures this was not the case, and the authors of Genesis wrote of creation they were concerned with God bringing the cosmos into operation by assigning roles and functions.

Creatio ex nihilo: the creation of matter
Creatio ex nihilo, in contrast to ex nihilo nihil fit, is the idea that matter is not eternal but was created by God at the initial cosmic moment. In the second century a new cosmogony arose, articulated by Plotinus, that the world was an emanation from God and thus part of God. This view of creation was repugnant to Christian church fathers as well as to Arabic and Hebrew philosophers, and they forcefully argued for the otherness of God and his creation and that God created all things from nothing by the word of God. The first articulation of the notion of creation ex nihilo is found in the 2nd century writing To Autocylus (2.10) authored by Theophilus of Antioch. By the beginning of the 3rd century the tension was resolved and creation ex nihilo had become a fundamental tenet of Christian theology. Theophilus of Antioch is the first post New Testament author to unambiguously argue for an ontological ex nihilo creation from nothing, contrasting it to the views of Plato and Lucretius who asserted clearly that matter was preexistent.

In modern times some Christian theologians argue that although the Bible does not explicitly mention creation ex nihilo, various passages suggest or imply it. Others assert that it gains validity from having been held by so many for so long; and others find support in modern cosmological theories surrounding the Big Bang. Some examine alternatives to creatio ex nihilo, such as the idea that God created from his own self or from Christ, but this seems to imply that the world is more or less identical with God; or that God created from pre-existent matter, which at least has biblical support, but this implies that the world does not depend on God for its existence.

In theology

In Jewish philosophy

Theologians and philosophers of religion point out that it is explicitly stated in Jewish literature from the first century BCE or earlier depending on the dating of 2 Maccabees:

2 Maccabees 7:28:
I beseech you, my child, to look at the heaven and the earth and see everything that is in them, and recognize that God did not make them out of things that existed.

Others have argued that the belief may not be inherent in Maccabees.

In the first century, Philo of Alexandria, a Hellenized Jew, lays out the basic idea of ex nihilo creation, though he is not always consistent, he rejects the Greek idea of the eternal universe and he maintains that God has created time itself. In other places it has been argued that he postulates pre-existent matter alongside God. But other major scholars such as Harry Austryn Wolfson see that interpretation of Philo's ideas differently and argue that the so-called pre-existent matter was created.

Saadia Gaon introduced ex nihilo creation into the readings of the Jewish bible in the 10th century CE in his work Book of Beliefs and Opinions where he imagines a God far more awesome and omnipotent than that of the rabbis, the traditional Jewish teachers who had so far dominated Judaism, whose God created the world from pre-existing matter. Today Jews, like Christians, tend to believe in creation ex nihilo, although some Jewish scholars recognise that Genesis 1:1 recognises the pre-existence of matter to which God gives form.

Hasidism and Kabbalah

In the perspective of the emanated created realms, the concept of Yesh me Ayin(something from nothing) is present.

Islamic
Most scholars of Islam share with Christianity and Judaism the concept that God is a First Cause and absolute Creator; He did not create the world from pre-existing matter.
However, some scholars, adhering to a strict literal interpretation of the Quran such as Ibn Taimiyya whose sources became the fundament of Wahhabism and contemporary teachings, hold that God fashioned the world out of primordial matter, based on Quranic verses.

Hindu opinion
The Chandogya Upanishad 6.2.1 says before the world was manifested, there was only existence, one unparalelled (sat eva ekam eva advitīyam). Swami Lokeshwarananda commented on this passage by saying "something out of nothing is an absurd idea".

Modern science

The Big Bang theory, by contrast, is a scientific theory; it offers no explanation of cosmic existence but only a description of the first few moments of that existence.

Metaphysics

Cosmological argument and Kalam cosmological argument
A major argument for creatio ex nihilo, the cosmological argument, states in summary:
 Everything that exists must have a cause.
 The universe exists.
 Therefore, the universe must have a cause.

An expansion of the first cause argument is the Kalam cosmological argument, which also requires creatio ex nihilo:
 Everything that begins to exist has a cause.
 The universe began to exist.
 Therefore, the universe has a cause.
 If the universe has a cause, then an uncaused, personal creator of the universe exists, who without the universe is beginningless, changeless, immaterial, timeless, spaceless, and infinitely powerful.
 Therefore, an uncaused, personal creator of the universe exists, who without the universe is beginningless, changeless, immaterial, timeless, spaceless, and infinitely powerful.

See also
 
 
 
 List of Latin phrases

References

Citations

Bibliography 

 
 
 
 
  
 
 
 
 
 
 
 
 
 
 
 
 
 
 

 
 
 
 
 
 
 
 
 
 
 
 
 

 

Physical cosmology
Christian cosmology
Christian terminology
Latin legal terminology
Latin words and phrases
Creation myths